The Relative currency strength (RCS) is a technical indicator used in the technical analysis of foreign exchange market (Forex). It is intended to chart the current and historical strength or weakness of a currency based on the closing prices of a recent trading period. It is based on Relative Strength Index and mathematical decorrelation of 28 cross currency pairs. It shows relative strength momentum of selected major currency. (EUR, GBP, AUD, USD, CAD, CHF, JPY)

The RCS is typically used on a 14*period timeframe, measured on a scale from 0 to 100 like RSI, with high and low levels marked at 70 and 30, respectively. Shorter or longer timeframes are used for alternately shorter or longer outlooks. More extreme high and low levels—80 and 20, or 90 and 10—occur less frequently but indicate stronger momentum of currency.

Combination of Relative currency strength and Absolute currency strength indicators yield entry and exit signals for currency trading.

Basic idea
Indicator basic idea is "buy strong currency and sell weak currency".
If X/Y currency pair is in an uptrend, it shows if it is due to X strength or Y weakness.
On these signals one can choose the most worthy pair to trade.

Signals

You can use Relative currency strength for pattern trading as well, among basic patterns which can be used are: cross, trend break, trend follow, divergencies.

Indicator

Advantageous for trading strategies
 Most commonly used as combination with Absolute currency strength
 information indicator to realize which currencies are being demanded, this is ideal indicator for trend follow traders
 help for scalpers looking for strength trend (trader can see both absolute and relative strength)
 instrument for correlation/spread traders to see reactions of each currencies on moves in correlated instruments (for example CAD/OIL or AUD/GOLD)

See also
 Absolute currency strength
 Currency strength
 Currency pair
 Relative Strength Index
 Forex
 Technical analysis

References

Technical indicators